Durianella is a fungal genus in the suborder Boletineae, family Boletaceae of the order Boletales. It contains the single species Durianella echinulata, described in 2008 and found in Peninsular Malaysia and Borneo.

Taxonomy
The fungus was originally collected in a jungle in Kemaman, Trengganu (Malaysia), on 24 June 1932, where it was found growing on soil buried in leaves at a river's edge. It was described as Hydnangium echinulatum by E.J.H. Corner and Lilian Hawker in 1953, although they noted that no other known species of Hydnangium had a spiny peridium. The species was known only from a single specimen until recollected in 2005 and 2006. Genetic analysis suggested it was a member of the Boletales suborder Boletineae, and not related to the genus Hydnangium of the Agaricales. The blue-staining suggested a relationship with Gyroporus, while the structure of the fruit bodies suggested an affinity with Pisolithus.

The genus name Durianella refers to the fruit bodies' resemblance to a small durian.

Description

Under the surface is a white 1–2 mm thick peridium which turns dark blue when cut – the superficial 0.5–1 mm doing so immediately, while the remainder takes 1–2 minutes to do so. The gelatinous gleba is in globules throughout the interior and also stains blue when cut. It is white when young and becomes tinted with orange with age. The white fibrous tissue surrounding the gleba lobules also turns blue on cutting. The fruit body has a well-developed columnella (a sterile column of tissue extending from the base of the gleba into the fruit body). It is egg-shaped, gelatinous, measuring 5–15 mm thick by 5–10 mm long. When injured, it stains grayish blue in 1–2 minutes. On the exterior of the fruit body, it is attached to the soil by orange rhizomorphs.

The spores are spherical or nearly so, and have a thick wall measuring 0.5–1.5 µm. The spore surface is covered with narrow spines up to 3 µm long; spore dimensions are 9–10 by 8.5–10 um (without spines) or 12–15 by 11.5–13.5 µm (with spines). The basidia (spore-bearing cells) are club-shaped, measuring 24–32 by 9–11.5 µm, and have two or four sterigmata up to 13 µm long.  Clamp connections are absent from the hyphae.

Habitat and distribution
Durianella echinulata is found under trees of the genus Shorea in Peninsular Malaysia and Borneo. It fruits on the ground singly, scattered, or in small clusters.

References

External links
 

Boletales
Monotypic Basidiomycota genera